Lionginas Šepetys (November 23, 1927 – December 9, 2017) was a Lithuanian politician.  He became Chairman of the Supreme Soviet of the Lithuanian SSR in 1981. In 1990 Šepetys was among those who signed the Act of the Re-Establishment of the State of Lithuania.

References
 Biography

External links
 Photo of Lionginas Šepetys (right) and Petras Griškevičius (left) at the ribbon cutting for the Lithuanian Folk Museum (Lietuvos liaudies buities muziejus) outside Kaunas in 1974, from the Lithuanian Central State Archives. archived 13 March 2016

1927 births
2017 deaths
Lithuanian communists
Culture ministers of the Lithuanian Soviet Socialist Republic
People from Ukmergė District Municipality